These are the squads for the countries that played in the 1947 South American Championship. The participating countries were Argentina, Bolivia, Chile, Colombia, Ecuador, Paraguay, Peru and Uruguay. Brazil withdrew from the tournament. The teams plays in a single round-robin tournament, earning two points for a win, one point for a draw, and zero points for a loss.

Argentina
Head Coach: Guillermo Stábile

Bolivia
Head Coach:  Diógenes Lara

Chile
Head Coach:  Luis Tirado

Colombia
Head Coach:

Ecuador
Head Coach:  Ramón Unamuno

Paraguay
Head Coach:  Manuel Fleitas Solich

Peru
Head Coach:

Uruguay
Head Coach:  Juan López Fontana

References

Squads
Copa América squads